Abu Bakar is a politician from Sirajganj district of Bangladesh. He elected a member of parliament from Pabna-6 in 1973 Bangladeshi general election.

Career 
Abu Bakar was elected a Member of Parliament from Pabna-6 constituency as an Bangladesh Awami League candidate in the 1973 Bangladeshi general election.

References 

Living people
Year of birth missing (living people)
People from Sirajganj District
Awami League politicians
1st Jatiya Sangsad members
People of the Bangladesh Liberation War